Dafu railway station is a railway station located in Guangfu Township, Hualien County, Taiwan. It is located on the Taitung line and is operated by the Taiwan Railways Administration.

References

1918 establishments in Taiwan
Railway stations opened in 1918
Railway stations in Hualien County
Railway stations served by Taiwan Railways Administration